James "Buffalo Jim" Barrier (March 22, 1953 – April 5, 2008), born in Cleveland, Ohio, was a local wrestling promoter for National Wrestling Conference in Las Vegas from 1994 to 1998. His legal struggle with business owner and landlord Frederick "Rick" Rizzolo, who owned land occupied by Barrier's auto repair business, was covered by the media during the early 2000s.

Career
Barrier moved to Las Vegas in 1971 from Cleveland, Ohio.  He later opened an auto repair shop, Allstate Auto & Marine, on Industrial Road, near the Las Vegas Strip.  The business was in operation until his death in 2008.  In the late 1990’s, he opened and operated a wrestling school, the Buffalo Wrestling Federation.  The school was sometimes the site of his popular local TV show, Jim Wars, that aired on Friday nights.  In addition to his auto repair business, wrestling school, and television show, Barrier wrote a weekly column on auto repair for the now defunct Las Vegas Mercury entitled “Nuts and Bold with Buffalo Jim.”

As a wrestling promoter, auto repair specialist, and entrepreneur, Barrier befriended numerous celebrities.  Among them are Hulk Hogan, the Undertaker, boxer Muhammad Ali, and wrestling and film star Dwayne “The Rock” Johnson. Barrier also possessed a large collection of celebrity memorabilia, from vehicles to a lock of musician Elvis Presley’s hair.  In addition to smaller pieces in his collection, Barrier also sported a car collection that included a Jensen Interceptor once owned by singer Wayne Newton and a pink Cadillac that was later borrowed by musician Kid Rock as part of his proposal to Pamela Anderson in Las Vegas in 2002.

Personal life
In 2005, Barrier was voted “Las Vegas’ Most Colorful Character” by the Las Vegas Review Journal, describing him as “a modern Renaissance man.”  He was also a single father of four daughters.

Legal dispute
Barrier was known in Las Vegas, because of media coverage, for winning a lengthy court dispute about parking spaces with his neighbor and landlord, Rick Rizzolo, former owner of the Crazy Horse Too gentlemen's club, located next door to Barrier's repair shop. Rizzolo was court ordered to sell the nightclub to satisfy debts. When the business did not sell, the U.S. Marshals Service seized the bar in September 2007, forcing its eventual closure. Rizzolo was released in late-March 2008 after serving a year in a federal prison on a racketeering and tax evasion conviction in U.S. Federal court.

Because of the government taking over the property, Barrier was forced to move. He was working with real estate professionals to secure a new location before he died.

Death
On the morning of April 6, 2008, the body of James Barrier was found in a Motel 6 on Boulder Highway, an older section of Las Vegas near a residential area.  According to police, Barrier was found lying in bed, face up, with an empty prescription bottle of Valium on the nightstand and his pants pulled down around his ankles.  A woman only known as "Lisa" who was found and talked to who was in the room with Barrier that night told police that Barrier had a seizure, however she did not report it at the time and left as his seizure occurred.  The official cause of death was ruled accidental, citing dilated cardiomyopathy.  Between April 2008 and June 2008, statements by then-Clark County Coroner Michael Murphy, also stated traces of cocaine in Barrier’s toxicology reports as a contributing factor to his death. Additionally, 20 mg of GHB in Barrier’s system, but was not seen as a factor leading to his death.

Suspicion of foul play 
While Barrier's death was ruled accidental by officials, friends and family have publicly stated that Barrier's death was a murder and remains unsolved.  Barrier's supporters and loved ones point to the following as evidence of foul play:

Release of Rick Rizzolo from prison 
The Las Vegas Review Journal observed the following:  "Barrier assisted the federal government in its investigation into tax evasion at Crazy Horse Too. Rizzolo pleaded guilty to tax evasion charges and spent one year and one day in custody. He was formally released April 4, two days before Barrier was found dead."

With Barrier's death coming so soon after the release of Rizzolo (a man with whom Barrier had numerous battles in court with over parking spaces, the obstacle of his auto shop interrupting Rizzolo's expansion plans, and Barrier's close work with the FBI prior to Rizzolo's trial and imprisonment), family and friends have speculated that Barrier's death is related to the release of the owner of the notorious club.

Death threats and the predictions of coming after Barrier using women or drugs
In the weeks and days before his death, Barrier had received death threats via phone and letters addressed to his auto repair shop.  On April 5, 2008, the day before his death, Barrier stated he received a phone call from someone identifying himself as a hitman and threatened to kill him.

In a first-person article for Las Vegas Weekly, journalist and Barrier friend Joshua Longobardy included a conversation he’d had with Barrier before Barrier's death:[Barrier] had already been on high alert. His concerns for his safety had exacerbated with the knowledge that Rick Rizzolo, the former owner of the Crazy Horse Too gentlemen’s club, who federal authorities allege has ties with organized crime families, and against whom Barrier helped solidify a federal case that resulted in a one-year prison sentence, had been released to the free world the day before.

For this reason Barrier had also called me on Friday evening. Earlier in the day he had received a phone call from a self-described hit man, and though Barrier didn’t believe anyone would attack him face to face, he did express concern about an alternative form of attack. Because I spoke to Barrier on a weekly basis, and because I had always known him to be a sensible man, I deemed his worries generally valid, and told him so. “Be aware of ambushes,” I said. He countered by stating his presentiment that his enemies—in name, the Rizzolo family and their associates—would try to get him through a stratagem. "They're gonna try to do it through a woman," he said. "Or they’re gonna try to drug me."Days after Barrier was found dead, Gus Flangas, an acquaintance and attorney for Barrier, was quoted in the Las Vegas Review Journal saying, "All I can say is the circumstances (surrounding Barrier’s death) seem suspicious; obviously it will warrant further investigation."

Auto shop break-in
A break-in occurred at Barrier's auto shop the day Rizzolo was released from prison.  Nothing was taken, but a sheet of paper containing his home address was prominently displayed on his desk, amid the refuse.  Friends and family theorize that this was a statement being made that someone was telling Barrier that they knew where he lived.

Missing vehicle
The keys to Barrier’s Rolls-Royce were in the room with him. However, the car was not seen in the parking lot when his two youngest daughters were brought to the room at the Motel 6 to identify his body.  The vehicle, which he had driven from his home to the Motel 6, was originally owned by casino developer Bob Stupak and was seized by Barrier after non-payment by Stupak for repair services.  After the Barrier family questioned police about the whereabouts of the Rolls-Royce, it was later found in the Motel 6 parking lot in an area that had been previously searched and did not originally contain his vehicle. It had also been cleaned.

Independent autopsy and coroner investigation 
Despite concerns voiced by the family and friends of James Barrier, the Clark County Coroner and Las Vegas Metropolitan Police Department investigators did not suspect foul play in the death of Barrier.  It was also stated by police officials that fingerprints were never taken at the scene of Barrier's death.

A preliminary report to Barrier's family stated there were no signs of drugs or a heart attack in Barrier's body.  A later autopsy report later stated that Barrier died of dilated cardiomyopathy (inflamed heart muscles).  The Las Vegas Review Journal reported the following from then-Clark County Coroner Michael Murphy, DBA:"Simms’ preliminary report indicated there were no signs of a heart attack, fueling the family’s belief that Barrier died under suspicious circumstances.

Murphy said that when an individual dies from a heart attack, the heart muscle is dead.

Barrier had no dead muscles but had heart disease. In medical terms, he died from a heart disease combined with cocaine use, Murphy said, clarifying Simms’ findings."Not satisfied with the findings of the Clark County Coroner, Barrier’s family hired independent pathologist Dr. Rexene Worrell to perform an autopsy.  Barrier’s family was promised photographs, video, audio, and notes documenting the examination upon completion of the autopsy.  Once completed, however, Worrell declined to provide the family with the findings, saying, “I need to hold on to the file in case it goes to court.”  As of 2018, 10 years after the independent autopsy, the information obtained by Worrell concerning Barrier’s body had yet to be released to the family.

In an effort to determine if Barrier had a recent history of drug use, Barrier's family requested that his body be exhumed to test hair samples from his body for drugs.  The Clark County Coroner's office stated they had no plans to exhume Barrier's body and that such an action could only be done at the request of law enforcement for a criminal prosecution.

"Death In a Vegas Motel" on the Unsolved Mysteries revival on Netflix 
On October 25, 2022, the Netflix revival of the popular television show Unsolved Mysteries aired an episode on Barrier's death titled "Death in a Vegas Motel."  Through interviews with his family members, friends, and others with knowledge of the case, the episode showcased some previously unknown details from Barrier's case that had been withheld from the news media and the public after Barrier's death in 2008 by the Las Vegas Metropolitan Police Department and the Clark County Office of the Coroner and Medical Examiner.  This episode's airing made it the first time in 14 years that these facts were revealed to the public.

Seven minute check-in discrepancy 
According to the Motel 6 security cameras on Saturday, April 5, 2008, Barrier was seen in the motel lobby checking into Room 105 at 8:22PM (a receipt for the room also notes the time of check-in as 8:22PM).  He is then seen exiting the lobby at 8:24PM.  However, the key card log at the Motel 6 shows that Room 105 (the room Barrier was given) was accessed by a guest key at 8:15PM, seven minutes prior to Barrier checking into his room.  The next entry on the key card log for Room 105 was when housekeeping first found him the next day on April 6th. This would mean that Barrier entered Room 105 seven minutes before he checked into the Motel 6 and received his key card to Room 105.

It should also be noted that in the reports obtained by Barrier's family from the Las Vegas Metropolitan Police Department, there is no mention of this backwards time jump.  In fact, the reports indicate that the investigating detectives do not account for, nor do they make any attempt to reconcile this time discrepancy.

"White powdery substance" not tested 
When Barrier was found in the motel room, the coroner investigator and police investigators stated that there was a "white powdery substance" on Barrier's shirt and beard.  While cocaine was found in Barrier's system, the reports from both the coroner and law enforcement indicate that the "white powdery substance" found on his beard and shirt were never tested to determine if it was actually cocaine. The substance was also was never matched with the cocaine found in Barrier's system.

In the episode, family and friends state that Barrier had been clean from using illicit drugs and alcohol for over a decade.  Barrier's family and friends believe that Barrier may have been forced to ingest the cocaine that was found in his system.

Pictures of the motel room as well as reports from the coroner and law enforcement indicate that no cocaine or other drug paraphernalia was found in the room.  The only place any "white powdery substance" was found was on Barrier's shirt and beard.

Funeral and burial
Barrier's funeral was on April 12, 2008 at the Palm Downtown Mortuary and Cemetery.  The following is a description of the mourners who came to show their respects:Before he was to be buried, four weeks ago, the great multitudes filed into the Palms Mortuary in the old part of Las Vegas to see Buffalo Jim Barrier one final time. They arrived in endless droves: midgets, wrestlers, Hells Angels, Native American Indians of unadulterated descent, lawyers, journalists, world-renowned neurosurgeons—the lame and the homeless—politicians, bankers, television executives, men who had more money than God, boxers, leviathans, Elvis impersonators, those like Buffalo who fixed cars and who arrived with fresh grease smeared across their jumpsuits, sinners, celebrities, folks as old as Vegas itself and young babes just born into the city this Spring.Barrier’s grave is located at the Palm Downtown Cemetery at 36.184451, -115.135685.

References

External links
https://www.buffalojimbarrier.com/ - Official website about the life and death of Buffalo Jim Barrier
James Barrier obituary

1953 births
2008 deaths
20th-century American businesspeople
Businesspeople from Las Vegas
Professional wrestling promoters